Rectory House, formerly the Dean's House, is an historic building in Dunkeld, Perth and Kinross, Scotland. It is two storeys, with a five-window frontage and later attic dormers.

In 1787, fiddler Niel Gow entertained Robert Burns here.

See also 

 List of listed buildings in Dunkeld And Dowally, Perth and Kinross

References 

Listed buildings in Dunkeld
Category B listed buildings in Perth and Kinross
1715 establishments in Scotland

Clergy houses in Scotland